This is a list of dishes found in Spanish cuisine.

Spanish dishes

Breads and pastries

Soups and stews

Condiments and sauces

Desserts

Dairy products
Spanish cheeses

Processed meat and fish
Spanish sausages

Others

Beverages

Alcoholic beverages
Beer and breweries, and Spanish wine

Non-alcoholic beverages

See also

 Merienda
 Andalusian cuisine
 Asturian cuisine
 Aragonese cuisine
 Balearic cuisine
 Basque cuisine
 Canarian cuisine
 Castilian-Leonese cuisine
 Cantabrian cuisine
 Castilian-Manchego cuisine
 Catalan cuisine
 Cuisine of the province of Valladolid
 Extremaduran cuisine
 Galician cuisine
 Leonese cuisine
 Valencian cuisine
 List of cuisines
 Denominación de origen
 List of Spanish soups and stews
 List of tapas
 List of Spanish cheeses

References

External links

 

Dishes